Five Legged Dog is the 25th album (not including split albums) by American rock band Melvins, released on October 15, 2021, through Ipecac Recordings. It is the first acoustic album released by the band.

Track listing

Charts

References

Melvins albums
2021 albums
Ipecac Recordings albums